Christian Myklebust (born 11 March 1992 in Ålesund) is a retired Norwegian footballer who played for Aalesunds FK.

He played youth football for Skedsmo FK before joining Lillestrøm SK's recruit setup in 2009. In 2010 he joined Aalesunds FK, made his debut in a 2010 Norwegian Football Cup match and scored a goal.

After four more seasons in Aalesund his career was put to an indefinite halt owing to injuries. He made a brief comeback for minnows Emblem IL in 2016. He went on to study at the Norwegian School of Economics in Bergen and play for the school's competitive fifth-tier team NHH FK.

Career statistics

References

1992 births
Living people
Sportspeople from Ålesund
Aalesunds FK players
Norwegian footballers
Eliteserien players
Association football midfielders
Association football forwards